Jack Whalen (May 11, 1918 – December 2, 1959), also called Jack O'Hara and "The Enforcer," was a criminal and freelance contract killer and bookie, who worked for the Los Angeles crime family, although he also was associated with Benjamin "Bugsy" Siegel, the Shannon brothers (Joe, Izzy, Moe, and Max) and Mickey Cohen during the 1940s and 1950s.

Life
Jack F. Whalen was born in Missouri on May 11, 1918. Whalen's father, Fred—who was also a career criminal—had enrolled Jack in military school to give his son a better life. Jack played polo in school and piloted bombers in World War II. After the war, he married into a rich family in Los Angeles; however, by 1955, his own criminal career had begun. He was soon called "The Enforcer" because he was "so tough he didn't need a gun."

Death

On December 2, 1959, Whalen was shot "square between the eyes" and killed at Rondelli's restaurant in Sherman Oaks in the presence of Mickey Cohen and three other of his associates. Sam Frank LoCigno,  although claiming self-defense, was charged with, but later acquitted of, the murder. Whalen was 41 years old at the time of his death.

In popular culture
Whalen is depicted in the 2013 film Gangster Squad by actor Sullivan Stapleton.
Whalen is also a featured character in James Ellroy's novel L.A. Confidential; as part of the power struggle for Mickey Cohen's criminal empire against gangster Morris "Mo" Jahelka.

References

External links

 

1959 deaths
Murdered American gangsters
Los Angeles crime family
Mafia hitmen
Bookmakers
1918 births
United States Army Air Forces bomber pilots of World War II
Deaths by firearm in California
People murdered in California